The Diocese of Port-Louis (Latin: Portus Ludovici; French: Diocèse de Port-Louis) is a Latin Church ecclesiastical territory or diocese of the Catholic Church located in the city of Port Louis, the capital city of Mauritius.

History
On June 6, 1837, the territory was established as the Apostolic Vicariate of Mauritius from the Apostolic Vicariate of Cape of Good Hope and adjacent territories. On December 7, 1847, the vicariate was promoted to a diocese.

Bishops
 Vicars Apostolic of Mauritius
 Bishop William Placid Morris, O.S.B. (June 6, 1837 – 1840)
 Bishop Bernard Collier, O.S.B. (February 14, 1840 – December 7, 1847 see below)
 Bishops of Port-Louis
 Bishop Bernard Collier, O.S.B. (see above December 7, 1847 – September 15, 1863)
 Bishop Michael Adrian Hankinson, O.S.B. (September 28, 1863 – September 21, 1870)
 Bishop William Benedict Scarisbrick, O.S.B. (December 22, 1871 – September 27, 1887), appointed titular archbishop in 1888
 Archbishop (titular) Johann Gabriel Léon Louis Meurin, S.J. (September 27, 1887 – June 1, 1895)
 Bishop Peter Augustine O'Neill, O.S.B. (May 22, 1896 – November 26, 1909)
 Bishop James Romanus Bilsborrow, O.S.B. (September 13, 1910 – February 7, 1916), appointed Archbishop of Cardiff, Wales
 Bishop John Tuohill Murphy, C.S.Sp. (July 8, 1916 – April 16, 1926)
 Bishop James Leen, C.S.Sp. (April 16, 1926 – August 1, 1933 see below)
 Archbishop (personal title) James Leen, C.S.Sp. (see above August 1, 1933 – December 19, 1949)
 Bishop Daniel Liston, C.S.Sp. (December 19, 1949 – April 23, 1968)
 Bishop Jean Margéot (February 6, 1969 – February 15, 1993) (Cardinal in 1988)
 Bishop Maurice Piat, C.S.Sp. (February 15, 1993 – present) (Cardinal in 2016)

Coadjutor Bishops
James Leen, C.S.Sp. (1925-1926)
Daniel Liston, C.S.Sp. (1947-1949)
Maurice Evenor Piat, C.S.Sp. (1991-1993); future Cardinal

Auxiliary Bishop
Peter (Pierce) Michael Comerford (1862), did not take effect

Other priest of this diocese who became bishop
Alain Harel, appointed Vicar Apostolic of Rodrigues in 2002, later became bishop of Port Victoria in 2020.

Schools
Secondary schools:
 Loreto College Bambous Virieux
 Loreto College Curepipe
 Loreto College Mahebourg
 Loreto College Port Louis
 Loreto College Rose Hill
 Loreto College St. Pierre
 College du Bon et Perpétuel Secours
 College de la Confiance
 College Père Laval
 College Sainte-Marie
 Notre Dame College
 Collège du Saint-Esprit
 Collège du Saint-Esprit Riviere Noire
 Saint Mary's College
 St. Mary's West College

Notes

References
 GCatholic.org
 Catholic Hierarchy

External links

 

1837 establishments in Mauritius
Religion in Port Louis
Religious organizations established in 1837
Roman Catholic dioceses and prelatures established in the 19th century
Roman Catholic dioceses in Mauritius